Marian Gheorghe (born 15 April 1963) is a Romanian modern pentathlete. He competed at the 1992 Summer Olympics.

References

1963 births
Living people
Romanian male modern pentathletes
Olympic modern pentathletes of Romania
Modern pentathletes at the 1992 Summer Olympics